Tariq Masood Arain is a Punjabi Pakistani politician who his the a Member of the Provincial Assembly of Sindh, from 2002 till now.

Early life and education
He was born on 1 July 1973 in Nawabshah District.

He is a graduate of University of Sindh.

Political career

He was elected to the Provincial Assembly of Sindh as a candidate of Pakistan Peoples Party (PPP) from Constituency PS-24 SHAHEED BANAZIR ABAD-I in 2013 Pakistani general election.

He was re-elected to Provincial Assembly of Sindh as a candidate of PPP from Constituency PS-38 (Shaheed Benazirabad-II) in 2018 Pakistani general election.

References

Living people
Sindh MPAs 2013–2018
1973 births
Pakistan People's Party MPAs (Sindh)
Sindh MPAs 2018–2023